Nigilgia toulgoetella is a moth in the family Brachodidae. It was described by Viette in 1954. It is found in Madagascar.

References

Natural History Museum Lepidoptera generic names catalog

Brachodidae
Moths described in 1954